Francis George (Frank) Downing (7 March 1907 – 22 December 1978) was an Australian politician and an ALP member of the New South Wales Legislative Assembly  from  1953 until 1968. .

Downing was born in Tumut, New South Wales and was the son of a council worker. He was the brother of Reg Downing, whose three-decade-long career in the NSW legislature included service as  Attorney-General; Thomas O'Mara, another parliamentarian, was a cousin.

Educated at St Joseph's College, Hunters Hill, Frank initially worked as a timber-worker before becoming an official in the Australian Timber Workers Union. His first attempt to enter parliament (in 1950) was unsuccessful; but he became the ALP member for Ryde at the 1953 state election, defeating the incumbent Liberal representative, Ken Anderson.

In the elections of 1956, 1959, 1962, and 1965, Downing retained the seat, which was abolished in 1968. During that year, he tried to gain the newly created electorate of  Fuller. This time he lost to the Liberal candidate, future party leader Peter Coleman. Thereafter Downing retired from public life. He was the chairman of caucus in 1959 but did not hold any ministerial office.

References

 

1907 births
1978 deaths
Members of the New South Wales Legislative Assembly
People educated at St Joseph's College, Hunters Hill
Australian Labor Party members of the Parliament of New South Wales
Australian people of Irish descent
20th-century Australian politicians